Shobana Sahajananan (born 26 April 1987) is a Malaysian Indian classical dancer of Indian descent.

Biography 

Sahajananan specializes in the classical dance forms of Odissi, Bharathanatyam and Bollywood. She started her dance training at a very young age. She studied Bharatanatyam under Guru Devi Maheswaran, later pursuing Odissi under guru Ramli Ibrahim's watchful eye. She be performed her Arangetram (graduation from Bharathanatyam) with her sister, Shalini, in May 2012. She also taught Bollywood dance in Kuala Lumpur Performing Arts Centre (KLPAC).

Sahajananan choreographs, conducts workshops, dance lecture demos and creates new Bharatanatyam, Bollywood, Modern/Classical fusions and experimental dance. In October 2011 she performed in the Short and Sweet Dance festival at KLPAC, where she attracted attention with her profound grace in Bollywood dance and in her dancing roots Bharathanatyam and Odissi. She performs on stage extensively.

Current work 

Sahajananan is now based in Singapore but travels monthly to Kuala Lumpur. She is currently freelancing, while teaching/dancing/choreographing in various places and tries to contribute to the local performing arts scene. She continues to look for opportunities in freelance work to dance, teach & create/choreograph in new classical and contemporary pieces.

See also 
Dance in India

References

External links 
 Kuala Lumpur Performing Arts Centre - Bollywood Dancing Classes
 Living Arts - Teaching Staff
 New Straits Times Health: Do the Camel and Snake
 YASNI Shobana Sahajananan
 hubflix hdmovieshub hubflix web series movies hubflix hdmovieshub hubflix web series movies
 Time Out, Kuala Lumpur Bollywood Dancing for Beginners with Shobana Sahajananan
  The Actors Studio Academy Courses

Odissi exponents
Performers of Indian classical dance
Living people
1987 births